Yakuwa Dam is a gravity dam located in Yamagata Prefecture in Japan. The dam is used for power production. The catchment area of the dam is 148.4 km2. The dam impounds about 186  ha of land when full and can store 49028 thousand cubic meters of water.

References

Dams in Yamagata Prefecture
1957 establishments in Japan